Making Music magazine was founded in 2004 as a bimonthly lifestyle music magazine devoted to the recreational musician and all instruments and genres of music. The publication's tagline is "Better Living Through Recreational Music Making."

The first issue debuted in November/December 2004. It was published six times per year until 2015 by Bentley Hall, Inc., located in the Armory Square district of  Syracuse, New York. Making Music lives on as an online-only magazine dedicated to supporting a community of musicians of all levels.

Making Music magazine’s editor-in-chief, Antoinette Follett appeared on the Today show with Kathie Lee & Hoda presenting easy-to-learn instruments on January 21, 2014.

Purpose 
The magazine defines its purpose as: "Making Music magazine encourages recreational musicians to become more engaged in playing their instruments and to participate in the larger music making community."

Featured celebrities and cover stories

Format
Each issue follows this general format:

Feature stories: Interviews with famous and not-so-famous recreational musicians and organizations, with a focus on the lifestyle benefits of playing and sharing music.
Tips & Techniques: Guides to music theory for beginners and intermediate musicians, maintenance tips, good practice techniques, and how to play with others.
Health issues: Advice on keeping the body in shape, health tools, ergonomic issues, music and memory, etc.
Product Spotlights: New product features, plus in-depth guides to buying instruments and accessories.

Staff
Founding Publisher and Editor-in-Chief Antoinette Follett.

References

External links
Making Music Magazine Homepage

Bimonthly magazines published in the United States
Music magazines published in the United States
Online music magazines published in the United States
Magazines established in 2004
Magazines published in New York (state)
Mass media in Syracuse, New York